The Fau is a 10.4 km river in the Haute-Saône department in the Bourgogne-Franche-Comté region of eastern France. It rises in Étobon and flows generally west to join the Rognon in Moffans-et-Vacheresse.

References

Rivers of Haute-Saône
Rivers of Bourgogne-Franche-Comté
Rivers of France